Dejan Sorgić (born 15 September 1989) is a Swiss professional footballer who plays as a forward for FC Luzern.

Career
On 20 July 2016, he joined Thun on a two-year contract. In October 2021, Sorgić returned to Luzern, signing a contract till 30 June 2023.

Career statistics

Club

References

External links

Player profile at FC Luzern's Website

1989 births
Living people
Sportspeople from Knin
Serbs of Croatia
Association football forwards
Swiss men's footballers
Swiss people of Serbian descent
Swiss Super League players
Swiss Challenge League players
FC Luzern players
FC Schaffhausen players
SC Kriens players
FC Thun players
AJ Auxerre players
Expatriate footballers in Switzerland